Kiowa County is the name of several counties in the United States:

 Kiowa County, Colorado 
 Kiowa County, Kansas 
 Kiowa County, Oklahoma